Al Jahra is a town and city located  west of the centre of Kuwait City in Kuwait. Al Jahra is the capital of the Al Jahra Governorate of Kuwait as well as the surrounding Al Jahra District which is agriculturally based. Encyclopædia Britannica recorded the population in 1980 as 67,311. Historically, Jahra was a predominantly agricultural area. There are currently various farms in Jahra.

History

Al Jahra was once largely dominated by agricultural land. Jahra was initially founded as a small oasis village. Jahra's most notable residents included Sheikh Thuwainy Bin Abdullah Al-Saadoun (Sheikh of Al-Muntafiq) in 1786, when he fled from Baghdad to Suleiman Pasha. He wanted to occupy Basra and Sheikh Abdullah Al-Sabah hosted him until he returned to Baghdad after he was pardoned by the Iraqi governor.

In 1925, Al Jahra administratively followed Kuwait City, and the population lived on the cultivation of palm trees and a little wheat and barley. Al Jahra contained 170 houses including the palace of Pasha al-Naqib and the palace of the Mubarak Al-Sabah.

Historically Jahra became known as a notable trading point and stopping place on the way to Kuwait City. It gradually grew into a town along the historic Kuwait Red Fort. Al Jahra was the site of the Battle of Jahra in 1920, a conflict between  Kuwaiti and  Saudi forces. Today, there is a national monument commemorating the battle. The conflict was settled in 1922 when King Abdul Aziz al-Saud recognized the independence of Kuwait in exchange for territory.

Gulf War

During the Gulf War, the outskirts of Al Jahra was also the site of an infamous shootout with the Allied destruction of a stalled Iraqi convoy as it retreated up Mutla Ridge on Highway 80 between February 25 and 26, 1991. The US Army received orders by General Norman Schwarzkopf Jr. to not let anybody in or out of Kuwait City and to effectively blockade the retreating Iraqi convoys within a 100-mile (160-km) radius. He ordered the dispatching of Apache helicopters armed with anti-tank missiles to block the Iraqis. Schwarzkopf commented in 1995 on the military action:

Fires
A number of damaging fires have been known to have occurred in recent times in Al Jahra. On 25 August 2007, politician Massouma al-Mubarak was forced to resign from her post as health minister following a fire in a hospital which killed two patients.

Then on August 15, 2009 a fire broke out at a wedding in Al Jahra. At least 49 people were killed and about 80 others wounded when the grooms' 23-year-old first wife, sought revenge for her husband's second marriage, poured petrol on a tent where women and children were celebrating and set it on fire. Within three minutes the whole tent, which had only one exit and did not meet fire safety regulations, was engulfed in flames, trapping many inside. It was the deadliest civilian disaster in Kuwait in the last 40 years.

Transport
Highway 80 connects the town to Abdaly on the Iraqi border. The highway has become known as "The Highway of Death" due to its involvement in the Gulf War when the Allied troops destroyed an Iraqi convoy. The road was repaired during the late 1990s and was used in the initial stages of the 2003 invasion of Iraq by U.S. and British forces. Today there is a blue sign at the Multa'a Ranch turnoff reading, "God Bless U.S. Troops". The surrounding area is desert but tents are often seen located along the highway. The nearest airport is at Kuwait International Airport.

Sport

The main football team is Al Jahra (football club). They play at the 25,000 capacity Al Shabab Mubarak Alaiar Stadium. They won the Kuwaiti Premier League once, in 1990. They participated in the Kuwaiti Premier League 21 times during the 2007-2008 season. Al Jahra has reached the Kuwait Emir Cup Final twice in 1996 and 2002 when they lost to Al Arabi 1-2 and Kuwait Club 0-1 respectively.

References

External links

 
Populated places in Kuwait